Shorna Akter (born 1 January 2007) is a Bangladeshi cricketer who plays for the Bangladesh cricket team as a right-handed batter and a right-arm leg break bowler.

Career
In December 2022, Shorna was selected in the Bangladesh's under-19 squad for the 2023 ICC Under-19 Women's T20 World Cup.

In January 2023, she was named in Bangladesh's squad for the 2023 ICC Women's T20 World Cup.

On 12 February 2023, she made her WT20I debut for Bangladesh, against Sri Lanka.

References

External links
 

2007 births
Living people
People from Jamalpur District
Bangladeshi women cricketers
Bangladesh women Twenty20 International cricketers